The FIS Nordic World Ski Championships 2005 took place 16–27 February 2005 in Oberstdorf, Germany, for the second time after hosting it previously in 1987. The ski jumping team normal hill event returned after not being held in 2003. The double pursuit distances of 10 km (5 km classical mass start + 5 km freestyle pursuit) women and 20 km (10 km classical mass start + 10 km freestyle pursuit) men were lengthened to 15 km for women (7.5 km classical mass start + 7.5 km freestyle pursuit) and 30 km for men (15 km classical mass start + 15 km freestyle pursuit). Team sprint was also added as well. The Nordic combined 4 × 5 km team event had its change between ski jumping points and cross-country skiing start time changed from 1 point equals to 1.5 seconds to 1 point equals 1 second at this championship.

Cross-country skiing

Men

Women

On the women's sprint classic, Sara Renner of Canada became the first North American skier to win a medal at the Nordic World Ski Championships.

Men's Nordic combined

7.5 km sprint
27 February 2005

15 km individual Gundersen
18 February 2005

4 × 5 km team
23 February 2005

Men's ski jumping

Individual normal hill 
19 February 2005

Individual large hill 
25 February 2005

Team normal hill
20 February 2005

Team large hill
26 February 2005

Medal table
Medal winners by nation.

References

External links
FIS 2005 Cross country results
FIS 2005 Nordic combined results
FIS 2005 Ski jumping results

 
FIS Nordic World Ski Championships
2005 in Nordic combined
2005 in cross-country skiing
2005 in ski jumping
2005 in German sport
2005 in Bavaria
International sports competitions hosted by Germany
Nordic skiing competitions in Germany
February 2005 sports events in Europe
Sports competitions in Oberstdorf